Portugal–Russia relations are foreign relations between Portugal and Russia. Portugal has an embassy in Moscow while Russia has an embassy in Lisbon.

The countries are the easternmost and westernmost in Europe. Both countries are full members of the Organization for Security and Co-operation in Europe.

History 
Full, ambassador-level, diplomatic relations between Portugal and the Russian Empire date back to 1779. Earlier, in 1724, Portuguese merchants appealed to Peter I to establish trading missions. Peter responded with appointment of a consul in Lisbon. There is no evidence, however, that the Lisbon consulate was actually established at that time. Trading between the two countries developed slowly, and the Russian consulate in Lisbon finally opened in 1769, headed by João António Borscher, a Portuguese-German banker from Hamburg. Borscher was not keenly interested in promoting Portuguese business interests, and trade between the two countries remained insignificant.

In September 1779, Maria I appointed the former ambassador in the Netherlands, Francisco José Horta Macedo, as Portugal's ambassador to Russia based in Saint Petersburg. Catherine II responded with appointing Count Wilhelm Nesselrode as an ambassador to Portugal. These contacts resulted in the 1782 Treaty on Armed Neutrality and the 1787 Treaty on Commerce. In 1799, the two countries signed a defensive alliance that did not precipitate into direct military action.

For most of the 19th century, relationships remained uneventful, gaining momentum in the last decade of the century when the Imperial Russian Navy regularly used Portuguese ports for replenishments. The crew of imperial yacht Tsesarevna in particular was hailed for their action in fighting the 1895 fire at the Portuguese Parliament. However, during the Russo-Japanese War in 1904, Portugal sided with the United Kingdom and refused to allow the Russian Navy access to its ports. 

After the February Revolution of 1917 in Russia, the ties between two countries were severed in 1918. Relations were not re-established until 1974 with the Carnation Revolution in Portugal and overthrow of the Estado Novo.

After the 2022 Russian invasion of Ukraine started, Portugal, as one of the EU countries, imposed sanctions on Russia, and Russia added all EU countries to the list of "unfriendly nations".

See also 
 Foreign relations of Portugal
 Foreign relations of Russia
 Russia–European Union relations

References

External links 
  Embassy of Russia in Lisbon

 
Bilateral relations of Russia
Russia